Dušan Poloz (born 9 May 1965) is a Slovak handball coach for the Slovak women's national team.

References

1965 births
Living people
Slovak handball coaches
Place of birth missing (living people)
21st-century Slovak people